David Kieran Nyika (born 7 August 1995) is a New Zealand professional boxer. As an amateur, he won a gold medal at both the 2014 and 2018 Commonwealth Games as well as competing at the 2017 and 2019 World Championships. Nyika and Sarah Hirini were the New Zealand flag bearers at the 2020 Summer Olympics. Nyika gained significant media attention after an incident during the Round of 16 at the 2020 Summer Olympics in which Moroccan boxer Youness Baalla attempted to bite Nyika's ear.

Amateur career

2020 Summer Olympics 

On July 27, 2021, Nyika won a Round of 16 match against Moroccan Youness Baalla in the Tokyo 2020 Summer Olympics. In what was described by commentators as a "disgraceful act", during the third round, Baalla attempted to bite Nyika. The biting incident overshadowed the competition as New Zealand media reported that it "marred" Nyika's Olympic debut.  The incident drew comparisons to Mike Tyson and Evander Holyfield's 1997 fight in which Tyson repeatedly bit Holyfield's ear.

On August 3, 2021, David Nyika won a bronze medal after being defeated in the men's heavyweight semifinal against Russian Olympic Committee's Muslim Gadzhimagomedov.

Commonwealth Game results 
Glasgow 2014
Round of 32: Defeated Luvuyo Sizani (South Africa) 2–0
Round of 16: Defeated Scott Forrest (Scotland) 3–0
Quarter-finals: Defeated Sumit Sangwan (India) 3–0
Semi-finals: Defeated Sean McGlinchy (Northern Ireland) 3–0
Final: Defeated Kennedy St-Pierre (Mauritius) 3–0

Gold Coast 2018
Round of 16: Defeated Yakita Aska (Antigua and Barbuda) 5–0
Quarter-finals: Defeated Christian Ndzie Tsoye (Cameroon) W/O
Semi-finals: Defeated Cheavon Clarke (England) 5–0
Final: Defeated Jason Whateley (Australia) 5–0

World Championship results 
Hamburg 2017
Round of 16: Defeated Igor Teziev (Germany) 5–0
Quarter-finals: Defeated by Evgeny Tishchenko (Russia) 4–1

Yekaterinburg 2019
Round of 32: Defeated Ahmed Hagag (Austria) 5–0
Round of 16: Defeated by Muslim Gadzhimagomedov (Russia) 5–0

Olympic Games results 
Tokyo 2020
Round of 16: Defeated Youness Baalla (Morocco) 5-0
Quarter-finals: Defeated Uladzislau Smiahlikau (Belarus) 5-0
Semi-finals: Defeated by Muslim Gadzhimagomedov (Russia) 4–1

Professional career

Early career 
On 26 January 2021, it was announced that Nyika would make his professional debut against Jesse Maio on the undercard of Joseph Parker vs. Junior Fa at Spark Arena on 27 February 2021. The bout would end in strange fashion as following a big right hand landed by Nyika that floored Maio, Maio would protest that the punch landed behind the head. Despite protestations from Maio that he had been hit behind the head, Nyika was awarded the win just 29 seconds into the opening round.

Following his bronze medal winning performance at the 2020 Summer Olympics Nyika would relocate to Morecambe, England in preparation for his second pro bout and would begin training under former WBO middleweight champion Andy Lee and would train alongside reigning WBC heavyweight champion Tyson Fury and former WBO heavyweight champion Joseph Parker. He would make his UK debut against Frenchman Anthony Carpin on the undercard of the rematch between Joseph Parker vs. Dereck Chisora  at AO Arena in Manchester on 18 December 2021. Nyika would progress to 2–0 dominating Carpin throughout the initial three minutes and when the bell rang to end the opening round, Carpin would retire on his stool complaining about an left elbow injury.
 
Nyika's next outing would be involved in a crowd-pleasing five-round scrap with Karim Maatalla on the undercard of George Kambosos Jr vs Devin Haney on 5 June, 2022. Nyika showcased some of the skills that helped him win Olympic bronze and two Commonwealth Games golds as he out-fought the game Maatalla over five rounds to win 49-46, 49-46 and 48-47 on the judges scorecards. Speaking on his performance after the fight, Nyika said, "Realistically, I'd give it like a C-, It was exactly what I needed. I needed some tough opposition, someone who can actually take the shots as well as give them back."

Professional boxing record

References

External links 
 

1995 births
Living people
Light-heavyweight boxers
Commonwealth Games gold medallists for New Zealand
Boxers at the 2014 Commonwealth Games
Sportspeople from Hamilton, New Zealand
New Zealand male boxers
New Zealand people of Ugandan descent
New Zealand people of Welsh descent
New Zealand people of English descent
Commonwealth Games medallists in boxing
Boxers at the 2018 Commonwealth Games
Boxers at the 2020 Summer Olympics
Medalists at the 2020 Summer Olympics
Olympic medalists in boxing
Olympic bronze medalists for New Zealand
Olympic boxers of New Zealand
Medallists at the 2014 Commonwealth Games
Medallists at the 2018 Commonwealth Games